Thaumantis noureddin, the dark jungle glory, is a butterfly in the family Nymphalidae. It was described by John Obadiah Westwood in 1851. It is found in the Indomalayan realm.

Subspecies
T. n. noureddin (Peninsular Malaya, Borneo)
T. n. chatra Fruhstorfer, 1905 (Borneo)
T. n. sultanus Stichel, 1906 (southern Borneo)
T. n. sigirya Fruhstorfer, 1911 (Sumatra, Bangka Island)

References

External links
Thaumantis at Markku Savela's Lepidoptera and Some Other Life Forms

Thaumantis
Butterflies described in 1851